Marek Kostoláni (born 6 February 1983) is a Slovak football midfielder who currently plays for ASK Mannersdorf. He previously played for FC Nitra and Nemzeti Bajnokság I club Budapest Honvéd FC. Kostoláni is the twin brother of Peter Kostoláni, who is also a football player.

Honours

Slovakia
Slovakia U20
2003 FIFA U-20 World Cup: Participation
Slovakia U19
 2002 UEFA European Under-19 Football Championship - Third place

References

External links

at HLSZ.hu

1983 births
Living people
Sportspeople from Bojnice
Slovak footballers
Slovakia youth international footballers
Association football midfielders
Slovak Super Liga players
FC Nitra players
SV Wacker Burghausen players
MFK Karviná players
ŠK Senec players
FK Bodva Moldava nad Bodvou players
Budapest Honvéd FC players
Budapest Honvéd FC II players
Nemzeti Bajnokság I players
Slovak expatriate footballers
Expatriate footballers in Germany
Expatriate footballers in Hungary
Expatriate footballers in Austria
Slovak expatriate sportspeople in Germany
Slovak expatriate sportspeople in Hungary
Slovak expatriate sportspeople in Austria